Terence H. Mekoski is an American politician serving as a member of the Michigan House of Representatives for the 36th district. He assumed office after a May 2022 special election.

Education 
Mekoski earned an associate degree in liberal arts and science from Macomb Community College and attended Northwestern University. He is studying toward a Bachelor of Science in criminal justice and police science at Columbia Southern University.

Career 
From 1982 to 1984, Mekoski worked as a detention officer in the Detroit Police Department. He served as a police officer in Detroit from 1985 to 1990. Mekoski joined the Oakland County Sheriff's Office in 1990 and served as a deputy until 1998, a sergeant from 1998 to 2012, a lieutenant in 2012 and 2013, and deputy commissioner of patrol services from 2013 to 2016. From 2016 to 2018, he served as a regulator agent for the Michigan Gaming Control Board. Since 2018, he has served as a senior financial investigator in the Drug Enforcement Administration.

Michigan House of Representatives 
Mekoski was elected to the Michigan House of Representatives in May 2022, succeeding Doug Wozniak, who was elected to the Michigan Senate. During his campaign, Mekoski called for a forensic audit of Michigan's 2020 presidential election results. After redistricting, Mekoski faced Wozniak in the August 2022 Republican primary for Michigans's 59th district. He placed second in the primary.

References 

Living people
Republican Party members of the Michigan House of Representatives
Macomb Community College alumni
People from Macomb County, Michigan
Year of birth missing (living people)